The 2012–13 Austrian Football First League was the 39th season of the Austrian second-level football league. It began on 19 July 2012 and ended on 24 May 2013.

Teams

Stadia and locations

Personnel and kits

Managerial changes

League table

Season statistics

Top scorers

Promotion/relegation playoffs

Teams

 FC Blau-Weiß Linz (finished 10th in First League)
 SC-ESV Parndorf 1919 (champions of Regionalliga Ost)
 LASK Linz (champions of Regionalliga Mitte)
 FC Liefering (champions of Regionalliga West)

First Leg

Second Leg

FC Liefering win 5-0 on aggregate and are promoted to the Austrian First League

SC-ESV Parndorf 1919 win 3-1 on aggregate and are promoted to the Austrian First League

References

External links
 

2. Liga (Austria) seasons
Austria
2012–13 in Austrian football